The Borough of St Leonards was a local government area in the Lower North Shore region of Sydney, New South Wales, Australia. First proclaimed as the Municipality of St Leonards in 1867, it became a borough in 1868 and in 1871 a petition for the Victoria Ward to secede was accepted and the Borough Victoria was proclaimed. It included the modern suburbs of Cammeray, Mosman, Waverton, Wollstonecraft and parts of Cremorne, Neutral Bay, North Sydney and Crows Nest. The borough lasted until 29 July 1890 when it merged with the neighbouring boroughs of Victoria and East St Leonards to form the Borough of North Sydney.

Council history
With the passing of The Municipalities Act, 1858, on 20 January 1866 139 residents of the St Leonards district petitioned the Colonial Government for the incorporation of the area as a "Municipality of Saint Leonards". This petition was subsequently accepted and the Governor of New South Wales, Sir John Young, proclaimed the establishment of the "Municipality of St Leonards" on 31 May 1867. On 24 December 1868 the Borough was divided into three wards: Victoria Ward (after Queen Victoria), Albert Ward (after Prince Albert) and Belmore Ward (after Governor Earl Belmore).

Edward Mawney Sayers was appointed as Returning Officer for the first election to be held on 4 July 1867. The first council, comprising nine Councillors and two auditors, was first elected on 6 July 1867, and the first Chairman, William Tunks, was also elected. The Council's status was short-lived however, as the Council was granted title changes with Councillors becoming Aldermen and the Chairman becoming Mayor from 20 September 1867.

By mid-1870 a petition of 172 names was presented to the Colonial Secretary asking for the secession of the Victoria Ward and the creation of a separate borough council. The petition was accepted and on 20 January 1871 the Borough of Victoria was proclaimed by the Governor. With the excision of Victoria Ward, the Borough of St Leonards was reconstituted without wards. The Borough was divided into wards again from 30 June 1883 with the creation of Albert Ward, Tunks Ward and Belmore Ward, but with the continuing growth of population in the area the wards were reorganised on 18 September 1889 by splitting Tunks Ward into Waringa Ward and Mossman's Ward.

The Borough lasted until 29 July 1890 when it merged with the Borough of East St Leonards (1860) and the Borough of Victoria to form the "Borough of North Sydney". The Mayor, Francis Punch, became the first Mayor of North Sydney, and the Council Clerk, William Barnett Smith, became the first Council Clerk of North Sydney.

Mayors

Council Clerks

References

St Leonards
St Leonards
St Leonards
St Leonards
St Leonards